Darío Echandía Olaya (October 13, 1897 – May 7, 1989) was a lawyer and a Colombian political figure, a member of the Colombian Liberal Party. He was born on October 13, 1897 in Chaparral, Tolima, son of Vincente Enchandia and Carlota Olaya de E. The elder of seven brothers, he was educated at Colegio Mayor de Nuestra Senora del Rosario and Colegio de Araujo (Bogota) receiving degrees of Attorney and Doctor in Law, 1917. He married Emilia Arciniegas, August 2, 1936. He died on May 7, 1989 in Ibagué, Tolima.

During his lifetime, Darío Echandía served as deputy for Tolima, senator for Tolima, president of the senate, magistrate in the Supreme Court of Justice, and in the ministries of Government, Education, Justice and Foreign Relations. He was also the Colombian ambassador to London and to the Holy See.

Darío Echandía was designated as acting president of Colombia on four occasions: From 1943 to 1944 due to the temporary absence of Alfonso López Pumarejo, in 1944 due to a kidnapping attempt against Pumarejo, briefly in 1960, and briefly in 1967.

The Darío Echandía Library (Biblioteca Darío Echandía) in Ibagué was inaugurated in 1984 in his honor.

References

1897 births
1989 deaths
People from Chaparral, Tolima
Colombian Roman Catholics
Colombian people of Basque descent
Colombian Liberal Party politicians
Del Rosario University alumni
Academic staff of the Free University of Colombia
Ambassadors of Colombia to the Holy See
Ambassadors of Colombia to the United Kingdom
Presidential Designates of Colombia
Foreign ministers of Colombia
Colombian Ministers of Justice
Colombian Ministers of National Education
Members of the Chamber of Representatives of Colombia
Members of the Senate of Colombia
Presidents of Colombia
Magistrates of the Supreme Court of Justice of Colombia